Nathaniel John Cartmell (January 13, 1883 – August 23, 1967), also known as Nat and Nate, was an American athlete who won medals at two editions of the Olympic Games. Importantly, Nate was on first racially integrated Men's Medley relay team that won Olympic gold medal at the 1908 London Olympics, which Nate helped form and featured Nate's fellow University of Pennsylvania alumnus and former teammate, Dr.  John Baxter Taylor Jr., the first black athlete in America to win a gold medal in the Olympics.  Nate is also known for being the first head coach of the North Carolina Tar Heels men's basketball team

Nickname
While the reason why Cartmell was nicknamed "Bloody Neck" is not entirely known, author Ken Rappoport speculates that it either comes from his use of the term Bloody due to the fact his family came from Cartmel, England, or from the fact that he had a childhood accident where he lost two and a half fingers from his right hand when an ax slipped while he was chopping wood.

1904 Summer Olympics

In the 1904 Summer Olympics in St. Louis, Missouri, Cartmell won silver medals in both the 100 meter dash and the 200 meter straightaway. He also participated in the 60 meters event but was eliminated in the repechage.

1908 Summer Olympics

Cartmell was a member of the gold medal American medley relay team at the 1908 Summer Olympics in London.  He was the second runner on the squad, running 200 meters.  He followed William Hamilton and was followed by John Taylor and Mel Sheppard.  In both the first round heat and the final Cartmell received a lead from Hamilton and built upon it before turning over the race to Taylor.  The team won both races, running the 1,600 meters in 3:27.2 in the first round and 3:29.4 in the final.  Cartmell's split for the final was 22.2 seconds.
 
He won the bronze medal in the 200 meter race at the same Games, taking his second medal in the event.  In the first round, Cartmell won with a time of 23.0 seconds.  The second round resulted in a 22.6-second time and another win.  Cartmell placed third in the final with a time of 22.7 seconds.

In the 100 meters, Cartmell placed fourth.  He won his first round heat and semifinal with times of 11.0 and 11.2 seconds, respectively.  He ran the final in 11.0 seconds.

Anecdote about run-in with policeman
While at the 1908 Olympics, Cartmell reportedly got into a fight with a policeman who "thrust himself into [Cartmell's] face and jabbered something". In response, Cartmell took the policeman's hand, pushed him and then ran off knowing that the policeman could not catch him on foot. Later, the police showed up at the hotel where the track team for the U.S. team was staying and arrested Charles Hollaway, another member of the team that looked like Cartmell.  Cartmell later found out about the mistaken arrest and tried to do something about it, but by the time Cartmell got to the police station Hollaway had already been bailed out and nothing more became of it.

North Carolina head coach

Cartmell came to UNC in 1909 as a track-and-field coach for the Tar Heels.  In 1910, student Marvin Rich along with certain school officials helped lobby to create a varsity basketball squad at UNC.  There was no coach for this basketball program, and UNC did not have enough money at the time to hire another full-time coach for this sport.  Cartmell was asked to be the first coach even though he did not know much about the sport.  Cartmell coached his first college basketball game on January 27, 1910, when UNC's varsity basketball team played in their first intercollegiate basketball game in Bynum Gymnasium against Virginia Christian College, which later became Lynchburg College.  The Tar Heels won their first game 42–21. The Tar Heels would end their first season with a 7–4 record.

In 1914, Cartmell was charged with illegally playing dice with known gamblers and was fired after the 1914 season.  He would be replaced by Charles Doak.

Later life
Cartmell went on to coach track and sometimes basketball at West Virginia University, Princeton University, Fordham University, Manhattan College and LaSalle Military Academy. He also coached track and field and cross country at Penn State from 1923 to 1933 before ending his career at the United States Military Academy in 1956. Recognized as one of the most respected athletes and coaches of his era, Nathaniel John Cartmell died in his home in New York City on August 23, 1967.

Cartmell served as the track coach at his alma mater, the University of Pennsylvania.

Basketball

See also
List of Pennsylvania State University Olympians

References

References

Sources

External links

 
 Nate Cartmell on databaseOlympics.com

1883 births
1967 deaths
Basketball coaches from Kentucky
American male sprinters
Athletes (track and field) at the 1904 Summer Olympics
Athletes (track and field) at the 1908 Summer Olympics
Olympic gold medalists for the United States in track and field
Olympic silver medalists for the United States in track and field
Olympic bronze medalists for the United States in track and field
Medalists at the 1908 Summer Olympics
Medalists at the 1904 Summer Olympics
College men's basketball head coaches in the United States
Army Black Knights track and field coaches
Fordham Rams track and field coaches
Manhattan Jaspers and Lady Jaspers track and field coaches
North Carolina Tar Heels men's basketball coaches
North Carolina Tar Heels track and field coaches
Penn Quakers track and field coaches
Penn State Nittany Lions cross country coaches
Penn State Nittany Lions track and field coaches
Princeton Tigers track and field coaches
West Virginia Mountaineers track and field coaches
DuPont Manual High School alumni
People from Union County, Kentucky
Track and field athletes from Kentucky